Nayika Nayakan is an Indian Malayalam-language reality TV talent show which was broadcast on Mazhavil Manorama from 28 May 2018 to 17 October 2018. The show's jury was headed by film director Lal Jose and actors Kunchacko Boban and Samvrutha Sunil.

The show featured 16 contestants; eight boys and eight girls competing in 4 rounds. The winners of the show were cast in leading roles in Lal Jose's film Solamante Theneechakal. Shambhu Menon and Darshana S. Nair were declared the winners of the show. The runners-up of the show Vincy Aloshious and Addis Antony Akkara were selected to play pivotal roles in the film.

Contestants 

 Special Awards

Cast

Hosts 
 Dain Davis (Episode 1-63)
 Pearle Maaney (Episode 1-31)
 Aswathy Sreekanth (Episode 31-63)

Judge 
 Lal Jose

Mentors 
 Samvrutha Sunil
 Kunchacko Boban

Guest Mentors 
 Episode 13 : Jayasurya

See also 
Solamante Theneechakal

References

External links 
 

Indian reality television series
2018 Indian television series debuts
Indian dance television shows
Malayalam-language television shows
2018 Indian television series endings
Mazhavil Manorama original programming